The Taurus Millennium series is a product line of  double-action only (DAO) and single-action/double-action hammerless, striker-fired, short recoil operated, semi-automatic pistols manufactured by Forjas Taurus S/A (Taurus Forge) in Porto Alegre Brazil.
The Millennium line was designed to contend in the civilian concealed carry firearms market, and to be sold as backup weapons for law enforcement officers.

Recall
In 2015 the PT-111 Millennium, PT-132 Millennium, PT-138-Millennium, PT-140 Millennium, PT-145 Millennium, and PT-745 Millennium were included in the settlement of a lawsuit which alleged that they, and certain other Taurus handguns, could fire accidentally if dropped and that Taurus covered up the safety defects. Without admitting guilt, the company paid $39 million, extended the warranties, and recalled the pistols for repair.

Design features

Taurus Millennium series pistols are manufactured with injection molded polymer frames, and blued carbon steel, stainless steel, or titanium slides.
Available cartridge chamberings include .32 ACP, .380 ACP, 9mm Parabellum, .40 Smith & Wesson, and .45 ACP. Magazine capacities vary between 6, 10, and 12 rounds depending on model and caliber. The Millennium line includes several innovative safety features including a positive firing pin block as well as the "Taurus Safety Latch", a transfer bar safety which prevents firing of the pistol unless the trigger is pulled. Together these safeties are intended to assure that the pistol will not fire if it is accidentally dropped. All Millennium models also include a frame-mounted safety lever. This safety feature was found to fail under some circumstances, leading to a recall.

Series
Three distinct series or generations of Millennium pistols have been produced. The 1st series featured double-action only triggers and a 10-round magazine capacity. The 2nd series resulted from a complete redesign of the 1st, but retaining the double-action only trigger system. The 2nd series also introduced the 'Taurus Security System' (TSS), the Taurus version of an Integrated firearm locking safety system, as well as the enhancements Taurus categorizes as the Millennium ‘Pro’ package. The 3rd series added single/double-action triggers on several models in lieu of the double-action only of the first two series. Additionally, the grips of 3rd generation pistols are available in various different colors and the grip stippling is altered; tactical or Picatinny rail accessory mounts are also an option.

Millennium Pro line
The Millennium Pro pistols offer many improvements over the standard models, but were introduced as enhancements to the originals, not to supplement them. Pro counterparts have now been released for nearly all of the original models. Some features of the Pro line include optional increased magazine capacities, larger and easier to operate controls, a single-action/double-action trigger mechanism on some models with reduced trigger travel and an improved smoother and lighter trigger pull, an enhanced frame, and an improved more ergonometric grip design. Key to the grip upgrade are recesses which Taurus call 'Memory pads', intended to promote a consistent shooting grip from shot to shot. Other Pro improvements include the contrast enhanced Heinie ‘Straight-8’ sighting system, as well as optional night sights, a loaded chamber indicator which can be felt as well as seen, and a feature labeled 'posi-traction' which consists of an alteration to the number and layout of the slide serrations resulting in an improved gripping surface.

Millennium G2
In early 2013, Taurus introduced a new G2 model to the Millennium pistol series.  The G2 features stippled texturing on the grips, replaces the slide retainer pin with Glock-style pulldown tabs to disassemble the firearm.  The Millennium G2 retains the same loaded chamber indicator as the prior Pro models, but replaces the Heinie ‘Straight-8’ sighting system with adjustable 3-dot sights.  The Millennium G2 comes in two models, the PT111 chambered in 9mm, and the PT140 chambered in .40 caliber.  The G2 models are rated for +P loads.  Since then, Taurus has introduced their G3C model, the same size as the G2, and their new G3 full size model.

Model designations
Taurus Millennium line model designations consist of 3 digits followed by 1 to 3 characters, which in turn may be followed by an optional third sequence of a dash and 2 digits. The leading three numerals indicate the model's cartridge chambering, for example, number 132 represents .32 ACP chambering, 138 corresponds to .380 ACP, 111 signifies 9 mm Parabellum models, 140 denotes the .40 S & W offering, and 145 indicates .45 ACP chambering. An optional 'P' character trailing the chambering digits indicates whether the pistol is a ‘Pro’ model, and the next 1 or 2 characters denote the slide composition. A ‘B’ indicates blued steel, the characters ’SS’ indicate stainless, and a 'Ti' signifies titanium. The optional final hyphenated number at the end of the model designation (either a -10 or -12) indicates an extended magazine capacity. Thus the model number 111BP-12 would indicate a 9 mm Millennium Pro pistol in blued steel with a 12-round magazine capacity, while model 138SSP-12 designates a .380 stainless steel Millennium Pro with a 12-round capacity.

Models

PT111
9 mm Parabellum caliber
The PT111 Millennium G2 is a 9mm with a capacity of 12+1.

Standard
Models 111B (blued slide), 111SS (stainless slide), 111SSG (stainless gray slide). Double-action only trigger. Weight 18.7 ounces, length: 6.00 inches, width: 1.268 inches, height:4.250 inches with flat base magazine,5.062 with pinky extension 6-groove 3.25-inch barrel with 1:9.84-per-inch rate of twist, 10-round magazine.

Pro
Models 111BP (blued slide, 10-round magazine), 111BP-12 (blued slide, 12-round magazine), 111SSP (stainless slide, 10-round magazine), 111SSP-12 (stainless slide, 12-round magazine), 111PTi (Titanium slide, 10-round magazine), 111PTi-12 (titanium slide, 12-round magazine), 111PG-12 (stainless slide & pink frame, 12-round magazine). single-action/double-action trigger, Heinie sights with ‘Straight-8’ rear. Weight: 18.7 ounces (111PTi and 111PIi-12: 16 ounces), length: 6⅛ inches, width: 1.125 inches, height: 5.125 inches, 6-groove 3.25-inch barrel with 1:9.84-per-inch rate of twist.

PT132
.32 ACP (Automatic Colt pistol) caliber.

Standard
Models 132B (blued slide), 132SS (stainless slide). Double-action only trigger. Weight 19.9 ounces, length: 6.125 inches, width: 1.280 inches, height: 4.500 inches, 6-groove 3.25-inch barrel with 1:9.84-per-inch rate of twist, 10-round magazine.

Pro
Models 132BP (blued slide), 132SSP (stainless slide). Double-action only trigger, Heinie sights with ‘Straight-8’ rear. Weight: 19.9 ounces, length: 6.125 inches, width: 1.280 inches, height: 4.500 inches, 6-groove 3.25-inch barrel with 1:9.84-inch rate of twist, 10-round magazine.

PT138
.380 ACP (Automatic Colt pistol) caliber.

Standard
Models 138B (blued slide), 138SS (stainless slide). Double-action only trigger. Weight 18.7 ounces, length: 6.125 inches, width: 1.232 inches, height: 4.917 inches, 6-groove 3.25-inch barrel with 1:9.84-per-inch rate of twist, 10-round magazine.

Pro
Models 138BP (blued slide, 10-round magazine), 138BP-12 (blued slide, 12-round magazine), 138SSP (stainless slide, 10-round magazine), 138SSP-12 (stainless slide, 12-round magazine). single-action/double-action trigger, Heinie sights with ‘Straight-8’ rear. Weight: 18.7 ounces, length: 6.125 inches, width: 1.232 inches, height: 4.917 inches, 6-groove 3.25-inch barrel with 1:9.84-inch rate of twist.

PT140
.40 S&W caliber.

Standard
Models 140B (blued slide), 140SS (stainless slide). Double-action only trigger. Weight 18.7 ounces, length: 6.25 inches, width: 1.291 inches, height: 5.098 inches, 6-groove 3.25-inch barrel with 1:16-inch rate of twist, 10-round magazine.

Pro
Models 140BP (blued slide), 140SSP (stainless slide). single-action/double-action trigger, Heinie sights with 'Straight-8' rear. Weight: 18.7 ounces, length: 6.125 inches, width: 1.25 inches, height: 5.125 inches, 6-groove 3.25-inch barrel with 1:16-inch rate of twist.

PT145
.45 ACP caliber.  As of 2013, the PT145 has been discontinued.

Pro
Models 145BP (blued slide), 145SSP (stainless slide). single-action/double-action trigger, compact frame, Heinie sights with 'Straight-8' rear. Weight: 22.2 ounces, length: 6.125 inches, width: 1.25 inches, height: 5.125 inches, 6-groove 3.25-inch barrel with 1:16-inch rate of twist, 10-round magazine.

PT745
.45 ACP caliber.

Pro
Models 745BP (blued slide), 745SSP (stainless slide). Double-action only (DAO) and a DA/SA version, compact frame, Heinie sights with 'Straight-8' rear. Weight: 20.8 ounces, length: 6.00 inches, width: 1.125 inches, height: 5.2 inches, 6-groove 3.25-inch barrel with 1:16-inch rate of twist, 6-round magazine.

References

External links
 (Brazil)
 (USA)

Semi-automatic pistols of Brazil
.32 ACP semi-automatic pistols
.380 ACP semi-automatic pistols
9mm Parabellum semi-automatic pistols
.40 S&W semi-automatic pistols
.45 ACP semi-automatic pistols